Beltrami is a city in Polk County, Minnesota, United States and was named in honor of Giacomo Costantino Beltrami (b. 1779, d. 1855), an Italian exile, who traveled to the Red river and the upper Mississippi in 1823.  Officially incorporated in 1902, there had been settlers in the area since 1870.  It is part of the Grand Forks, ND-MN Metropolitan Statistical Area. The population was 88 at the 2020 census.

Geography

Minnesota Highway 9 and Polk County Highway 1 are two of the main routes in the community.

Demographics

2010 census
As of the census of 2010, there were 107 people, 42 households, and 32 families living in the city. The racial makeup of the city was 100.0% White.

There were 42 households, of which 28.6% had children under the age of 18 living with them, 61.9% were married couples living together, 9.5% had a female householder with no husband present, 4.8% had a male householder with no wife present, and 23.8% were non-families. 16.7% of all households were made up of individuals, and 4.8% had someone living alone who was 65 years of age or older. The average household size was 2.55 and the average family size was 2.84.

The median age in the city was 47.1 years. 24.3% of residents were under the age of 18; 5.6% were between the ages of 18 and 24; 15% were from 25 to 44; 34.5% were from 45 to 64; and 20.6% were 65 years of age or older. The gender makeup of the city was 46.7% male and 53.3% female.

2000 census
As of the census of 2000, there were 101 people, 44 households, and 31 families living in the city. There were 48 housing units at an average density of 23.9 per square mile (9.2/km2). The racial makeup of the city was 97.03% White, and 2.97% from two or more races.

There were 44 households, out of which 34.1% had children under the age of 18 living with them, 59.1% were married couples living together, 6.8% had a female householder with no husband present, and 29.5% were non-families. 27.3% of all households were made up of individuals, and 13.6% had someone living alone who was 65 years of age or older. The average household size was 2.30 and the average family size was 2.74.

In the city, the population was spread out, with 24.8% under the age of 18, 3.0% from 18 to 24, 25.7% from 25 to 44, 23.8% from 45 to 64, and 22.8% who were 65 years of age or older. The median age was 44 years. For every 100 females, there were 98.0 males. For every 100 females age 18 and over, there were 85.4 males.

The median income for a household in the city was $30,833, and the median income for a family was $31,250. Males had a median income of $31,250 versus $13,750 for females. The per capita income for the city was $14,928. There were 6.7% of families and 10.2% of the population living below the poverty line, including 15.0% of under eighteens and 8.3% of those over 64.

References

Cities in Minnesota
Cities in Polk County, Minnesota